Nancy Kacungira (born 1986) is a Ugandan presenter and reporter at BBC News. She presented Focus on Africa from 2017 to January 2019 and World Business Report on BBC World News.

After a stint presenting World News Today in August 2018, she became the main presenter at 7 pm weekdays and 9 pm weekends from September 2019 when she is not on assignment, as part of here 19:00–01:00GMT/BST, on BBC Four, BBC News Channel and BBC World News, and has presented In Business Africa since January 2019, a programme she presented alongside  Ashionye Ogene. She also is a relief presenter for The Briefing at 05:00GMT on BBC One, BBC News Channel and BBC World News. In 2022 she also started presenting on BBC World Service Outside Source, though she as of April is yet to present the TV edition.

At the beginning of June 2020, she began presenting most of the evening output two in three weekends, on both BBC News Channel and BBC World News. Including the second half of BBC News at Ten on Friday and Saturday, alternative Sundays.

Career

Kacungira began as a radio presenter while still at university, working her way up from intern to Deputy Program Director by the time she received her first class degree. She then earned her Master of Arts degree in Communication Studies from the University of Leeds, where she graduated with distinction.

Kacungira began her media career as a radio presenter at Power FM, a Christian radio station in Kampala, Uganda. In 2010 Kacungira together with her older sister Seanice Kacungira co-founded Blu Flamingo; a digital media management company. She moved from radio to TV at NTV Uganda as a newsreader from 2012 to 2013, after which she moved to Kenya to work for KTN News Kenya as a social media editor in late 2013.

While still at KTN News Kenya in 2015, Kacungira applied for the Komla Dumor Award, which she won and went to the BBC for three months' training. She then returned to KTN News Kenya but was later hired by the BBC where she presented Focus on Africa, but later became the main presenter of World News Today and In Business Africa, a main presenter at weekends and correspondent both BBC News Channel and BBC World News.

In 2016, Kacungira was one of the two moderators at the Ugandan presidential debate with another Ugandan BBC presenter Alan Kasujja.

Awards
2015 – BBC World News Komla Dumor Award

Personal Life
Kacungira announced via Instagram that she had married her boyfriend in January 2023

References

Living people
BBC newsreaders and journalists
BBC World News
Ugandan journalists
Ugandan women journalists
Ugandan radio journalists
Ugandan women radio journalists
Ugandan radio presenters
Ugandan women radio presenters
Ugandan television presenters
Ugandan television journalists
Ugandan women television journalists
Ugandan women television presenters
Alumni of the University of Leeds
1986 births